Peter Steedman Miller (15 April 1908 – 19 May 1979) was a Scottish footballer with "great footwork".

Career
Miller played for Bo'ness and Grange Rovers, before spending 1929–30 with First Division club Falkirk. He then moved to England to play for Watford, making 14 appearances in 1930–31, as the Vicarage Road outfit struggled near the bottom of the Third Division South. He then moved on to league rivals New Brighton, who had to apply for re-election in both 1931–32 and 1932–33. After improved efforts in 1933–34 and 1934–35, he spent 1935–36 in France with Ligue 2 side Le Havre. He returned to England with Third Division North side Rotherham United, and scored on his debut on 25 January, his goal contributing to a 4–0 win over Darlington at Millmoor. He scored a total of three goals in 11 leagues games for the "Millers". He joined Port Vale in June 1936, and scored on his debut in a 3–1 defeat to Hull City at The Old Recreation Ground on 29 August. However, he failed to score over his next 12 Third Division North games, and was given a free transfer in April 1937.

Career statistics
Source:

References

1908 births
1979 deaths
Footballers from Falkirk (council area)
Scottish footballers
Association football inside forwards
Bo'ness F.C. players
Falkirk F.C. players
Watford F.C. players
New Brighton A.F.C. players
Scottish expatriate footballers
Expatriate footballers in France
Le Havre AC players
Rotherham United F.C. players
Port Vale F.C. players
Scottish Football League players
English Football League players
Ligue 2 players
People from Bo'ness